Eremophila scrobiculata is low, spreading shrub with sessile, linear leaves and lilac-coloured flowers and that is endemic to Western Australia. It grows on the slopes of low, stony hills on Wanna Station.

Description
Its branches are glabrous and grey. The four stamens are enclosed in the petal tube. Flowering mainly occurs from June to August but also at other times after rainfall.

Taxonomy and naming 
This species was first formally described in 2016 by Bevan Buirchell and Andrew Phillip Brown in the journal Nuytsia from specimens on Wanna Station (north of Mount Augustus National Park) in 2005. The specific epithet (scrobiculata) is from the Latin scrobiculatus meaning "scrobiculate", or "furrowed or having the surface dotted all over with small round depressions" referring to the leaves.

Distribution and habitat
Eremophila scrobiculata is only known from the type location where it grows on the slopes of small, stony hills in the Gascoyne biogeographic region.

Conservation
Eremophila scrobiculata classified as "Priority One" by the Government of Western Australia Department of Parks and Wildlife, meaning that it is known from only one or a few locations which are potentially at risk.

References

Eudicots of Western Australia
scrobiculata
Rosids of Western Australia
Endemic flora of Western Australia
Plants described in 2016
Taxa named by Bevan Buirchell
Taxa named by Andrew Phillip Brown